Manon Labrecque (born 1965) is a Canadian artist based in Montreal. 

In 2007 she was awarded the artistic creation prize at the Rendez-vous du cinéma québécois.
In 2013 she won the Prix Louis-Comtois for mid-career artists. Her work is included in the collections of the Musée national des beaux-arts du Québec, the Montreal Museum of Fine Arts and the National Gallery of Canada

References

Living people
1965 births
20th-century Canadian women artists
21st-century Canadian women artists